General elections were held in Turkey on 24 June 2018. Presidential elections were held to elect the President of Turkey using a two-round system. Parliamentary elections took place to elect 600 Members of Parliament to the Grand National Assembly of Turkey.

The elections had originally been scheduled for 3 November 2019, until the Erdoğan government called for early elections on 18 April 2018.

Background

2017 constitutional referendum

The ruling Justice and Development Party (AKP) and Erdoğan had long supported a policy of turning Turkey into an executive presidency, replacing the existing parliamentary system of government. With the support of the Nationalist Movement Party (MHP), the government was able to enact a referendum in Parliament, with the vote being set for 16 April 2017.

The proposed constitutional changes would see parliamentary and presidential elections taking place on the same day every five years, with the initial vote being set for 3 November 2019. The number of seats in the Grand National Assembly was to be increased from 550 to 600, although the legislative powers of Parliament would be greatly reduced. Crucially, the office of the President of Turkey would be given powers to rule by decree, becoming both the country's head of state and head of government. Supporters of the changes claimed that the new system would make the system of government more efficient, while critics claimed that it would place too much power in the hands of the president and effectively render parliament powerless.

The constitutional changes were approved by a 51-49% margin, according to official results. However, a last-minute change in the election rules by the Supreme Electoral Council (YSK) during the vote allowed unverified ballots to be accommodated into the count, which the opposition alleges added 1.5 million extra ballot papers. The political opposition decried the move to be illegal and were backed by several overseas observer organisations, which claimed that the vote did not meet international standards. However, subsequent legal challenges were all unsuccessful. Thus, the government began enacting 'compliance laws' to prepare for the new executive presidential system of government, which would be fully implemented following the general election scheduled for 3 November 2019.

Early election
Despite over two years to go before the next presidential and parliamentary elections, many observers alleged that the government was preparing for an early vote soon after the 2017 referendum. This was, observers claimed, to speed up the implementation of the executive presidential system and also to prevent the popularity of new opposition movements from reducing support for the government. In October 2017, opposition leader Kemal Kılıçdaroğlu called for early elections, although there was no official response to this. Meral Akşener, the leader of the newly formed Good Party, alleged that the government were planning an early vote for Sunday 15 July 2018, the second anniversary of the failed 2016 coup d'état attempt. The party held its first ordinary congress on 10 December 2017 and first extraordinary congress on 1 April 2018 in order to be eligible to contest a possible snap election. Despite months of speculation, the government repeatedly claimed that it was in favour of holding elections when they were due, denying that an early vote would take place.

On 17 April 2018, Devlet Bahçeli, the leader of the Nationalist Movement Party, called for early elections for the 26th of August. Bahçeli had previously announced that they would support a re-election bid of the incumbent president, Recep Tayyip Erdoğan. The Justice and Development Party (AKP), led by Erdoğan, had recently announced an electoral alliance with the MHP called the People's Alliance. Following his call for early elections, Bahçeli met Erdoğan a day later on 18 April. Erdoğan subsequently announced that his party agreed with Bahçeli that an early election was needed to solve the ongoing 'political and economic uncertainty'. He therefore announced that early elections would take place on 24 June 2018.

Presidential election

Candidates

Results

Parliamentary election

Parties contesting the election

Results

Controversies

The election process was overshadowed many multiple allegations of violations of its integrity. Prominent among them was the allegation of widespread ballot stuffing for the benefit of AKP and MHP parties in Turkey's east, in particular in Şanlıurfa province.

See also
2018 Turkish parliamentary election
2018 Turkish presidential election
Turkish currency and debt crisis, 2018
Opinion polling for the Turkish general election, 2018

References

External links

 
June 2018 events in Turkey
General elections in Turkey